Forty Winks is a 1925 American silent comedy film directed by Paul Iribe and Frank Urson and written by Bertram Millhauser. The film stars Raymond Griffith, Theodore Roberts, Cyril Chadwick, William Boyd, and Anna May Wong. The film was released on February 2, 1925, by Paramount Pictures.

Plot
As described in a review in a film magazine, Gasper Le Sage (Chadwick) is attorney to the Butterworths and suitor for the hand of Eleanor Butterworth (Dana). He persuades Annabelle Wu (Wong), a Eurasian adventuress, to vamp Lt. Gerald Hugh Butterworth (Boyd) and with his keys obtain the plans for a coast defence movement. Suspicion falls upon Lord Chumley of the British secret service, who is also engaged to Eleanor. Le Sage offers to recover the papers if Ealanor will marry him, but "Chumley" forestalls him and gets the papers and wins the young woman's affections after a lively and variagated chase.

Cast

Preservation
With no prints of Forty Winks located in any film archives, it is a lost film.

See also
 Lord Chumley (1914)

References

External links

Stills at silentfilmstillarchive.com

1925 films
1920s English-language films
Silent American comedy films
1925 comedy films
Paramount Pictures films
Lost American films
American black-and-white films
American silent feature films
Remakes of American films
American films based on plays
1925 lost films
Lost comedy films
Films directed by Frank Urson
Films directed by Paul Iribe
1920s American films